Anthony Charles Deane (1870–1946) was canon of Worcester Cathedral, poet and writer of religious books. He was the son of H. C. Deane, a barrister-at-law. In 1898, he married Maud, the second daughter of Col. Versturme-Bunbury of Bath. He is perhaps best known as a writer of popular Christian books.

Studies
He was schooled at Wellington College, and did undergraduate and graduate (M.A.) studies at Clare College, Cambridge. He attended Cuddesdon Theological College and was a student of Lincoln's Inn in 1891.

Ministry
He was ordained in 1893, and became canon of Worcester Cathedral. He was vicar of Great Malvern and rural dean of Powyke from 1909 to 1913, when he became vicar of Hampstead. While at Malvern he was also chaplain of the Worcestershire Yeomanry. In 1929 he was appointed Canon of the ninth stall at St George's Chapel, Windsor Castle, a position he held until 1946.

Author and poet
In 1895 he wrote an article in a periodical, The Nineteenth Century, titled The Religion of the Undergraduate, wherein he asserted that an "easy-going agnosticism" was evident in the average student at Oxford. This agnosticism was further accepted as the "symbol of intellectual manhood", being encouraged by younger dons and tacitly accepted by older ones. His remarks were generally countered in the lively debate that followed. In 1905 his poem St. Columba was awarded the Seatonian Prize by the University of Cambridge. He was editor of the Treasury Magazine from 1903 to 1909. He was a member of the Authors' Club, and his recreational activities were listed as golf, lawn tennis and music.

List of publications
Besides various poetry compilations and religious books, some of his talks or sermons also appeared in print:
 Frivolous Verses, Cambridge Eng., Redin, 1892, 
 Holiday Rhymes, London, Henry, 1894, 
 The Religion of the Undergraduate, (article in periodical) The Nineteenth Century, Oct., Nov., Dec., 1895 
 Leaves in the Wind, 1896
 A Poet's Choice, 1898
 St. Paul and his Friends, 1900
 New Rhymes for Old and Other Verses, 1901
 A Little Book of Light Verse, London, Methuen, 1902, 
 Selected Poems of George Crabbe, 1903 
 At the Master's Side, 1905
 St. Columba, 1905
 The Reformation, Nisbet & Co, 1907
 The Society of Christ, 1908
 New Testament Studies, 1909
 Christmas Songs and other Verses, 1911
 In My Study, London, J. Nisbet, 1913
 A Short Account of Great Malvern Priory Church, a History of the Monastery, and Description of the Fabric, G. Bell & Sons, ltd, 1914, 
 His own place: The tercentenary "Shakespeare sermon," preached in the Church of the Holy Trinity, Stratford-on-Avon, 30 April 1916, J. Hewetson & Son, 1916
 A library of religion, London: A.R. Mowbray & co.; Milwaukee, U.S.A.: The Morehouse publishing co., 1918
 Rabboni, A Study of Jesus Christ the Teacher, London, Hodder & Stoughton, 1921
 The Life of Thomas Cranmer, Archbishop of Canterbury, 1927
 Selections from George Crabbe, Deane ed., Methuen; 2nd ed., 1932
 How to enjoy the Bible, Hodder & Stoughton, 1934
 Pillars of the English church: Biographical studies of eminent churchmen; broadcast address, Morehouse publishing co, 1934
 How to understand the gospels, London, Hodder & Stoughton, 1936, 
 The valley and beyond, New York, Harper, 1936
 Sixth form religion, London, Hodder & Stoughton, 1936 NoISBN
 The Lord's prayer, Hodder & Stoughton, 1938
 St. Paul and his letters, Hodder & Stoughton, 1942
 Jesus Christ, The world Christ knew; the social, personal and political conditions of His time.
 To an unseen audience
 Jesus and the unbroken life
 Time Remembered, London, Faber & Faber, 1945

References

External links
 
 
 A Rustic Song

1870 births
1946 deaths
20th-century English Anglican priests
Anglican writers
English religious writers
People associated with Malvern, Worcestershire
Canons of Windsor